Forlorn River is a 1926 American silent Western film directed by John Waters and written by Zane Grey and George C. Hull. The film stars Jack Holt, Raymond Hatton, Arlette Marchal, Edmund Burns, Tom Santschi, Joseph W. Girard and Christian J. Frank. It is based on the novel Forlorn River by Zane Grey. The film was released on September 27, 1926, by Paramount Pictures.

Parts of the film were shot in Zion National Park, Bryce Canyon, and Cedar Breaks National Monument.

The film is now considered lost.

Cast 
 Jack Holt as Nevada
 Raymond Hatton as Arizona Pete
 Arlette Marchal as Ina Blaine
 Edmund Burns as Ben Ide
 Tom Santschi as Bill Hall
 Joseph W. Girard as Hart Blaine 
 Christian J. Frank as Les Setter
 Nola Luxford as Magda Lee
 Al Hart as Sheriff Stroble 
 Nola Dolberg as Magda Lee
 Chief Yowlachie as Modoc Joe
 Jack Moore as Deputy

References

External links 
 

1926 films
1926 Western (genre) films
Paramount Pictures films
Films directed by John Waters (director born 1893)
Films based on works by Zane Grey
American black-and-white films
Films shot in Utah
Lost American films
Lost Western (genre) films
1926 lost films
Silent American Western (genre) films
1920s English-language films
1920s American films